Krásná Ves is a municipality and village in Mladá Boleslav District in the Central Bohemian Region of the Czech Republic. It has about 200 inhabitants.

History
The first written mention of Krásná Ves is from 1388.

References

Villages in Mladá Boleslav District